The Summer Live '09 tour was the fourth North American concert tour of the 21st century by Paul McCartney. The tour began on 17 July 2009 in New York City and concluded on 19 August 2009 in Arlington, Texas. It visited 6 cities across North America earning $32 million from nine shows.

Background
McCartney performed three nights at the new Citi Field in New York City on 17, 18 and 21 July 2009, replicating his role as a Beatle opening the newly opened Shea Stadium in 1965. To promote the tour, McCartney appeared on Late Show with David Letterman on 15 July, and performed a seven-song mini-concert atop the marquee of the Ed Sullivan Theater (although only two songs, "Get Back" and "Sing the Changes" were aired). Good Evening New York City, a live CD/DVD of the Citi Field concerts was released on 17 November 2009; furthermore, the Deluxe Edition contains the complete 7 song mini-concert.

Tour band
 Paul McCartney: Lead Vocals, Bass, Acoustic Guitar, Piano, Electric Guitar, Ukulele, Mandolin
 Rusty Anderson: Backing Vocals, Electric Guitar, Acoustic Guitar
 Brian Ray: Backing Vocals, Electric Guitar, Acoustic Guitar, Bass
 Paul "Wix" Wickens: Backing Vocals, Keyboards, Accordion, Electric Guitar, Percussion, Harmonica
 Abe Laboriel Jr.: Backing Vocals, Drums, Percussion

Tour dates

Set list
Drive My Car
Jet
Only Mama Knows
Flaming Pie
Got to Get You into My Life
Let Me Roll It (with Foxy Lady ending)
Highway
The Long and Winding Road
My Love
Blackbird
Here Today
Dance Tonight
Calico Skies
Michelle (played only in Washington, in honour of Michelle Obama)
It is So Easy (played only in Texas, as a tribute to Buddy Holly)
Mrs. Vandebilt
Eleanor Rigby
Sing the Changes
Band on the Run
Back in the U.S.S.R.
I'm Down
Something
I've Got a Feeling
Paperback Writer
A Day in the Life/Give Peace a Chance
Let It Be
Live and Let Die
Hey Jude1st Encore:
Day Tripper
Lady Madonna
I Saw Her Standing There (with Billy Joel on 17 July at Citi Field)2nd Encore:
Yesterday
Helter Skelter
Get Back
Sgt. Pepper's/The End medley

References

External links
Paul McCartney.com - official website
Paul McCartney Central - fansite with concert tour listing

2009 concert tours
Paul McCartney concert tours